McCartney Library is an academic library located on the campus of Geneva College in Beaver Falls, Pennsylvania, United States.  The building is named after the influential evangelical minister Dr. Clarence E. Macartney who grew up in Fern Cliffe House when the college moved to Beaver Falls in 1880.

Today, the library consists of more than 400,000 items available to students and professors as well as surrounding community members.  There is an online database for the library, and also an online catalog called "MacCat". The library includes a newly refurbished media center located on the ground floor and also houses collections of books about the college and the history of the Reformed Presbyterian Church of North America, along with many other sources in the Covenanter Collection, the Geneva Author Collection, and Dr. Macartney's private collection; developed over the 160-year history of Geneva College.

Mission statement
The McCartney Library's mission is to provide the students, faculty, and friends of Geneva College with the information service, books, journals, pamphlets, microforms, electronic data, audio-visual media, and instructional presentation materials needed to educate and minister to a diverse Christian learning community.  Library materials and service are for the purpose of developing servant-leaders and to assist them in transforming society for the Kingdom of Christ.  To this end, the Library collects, organizes, and circulates the learning resources in an efficient and effective manner to meet their general informational and recreational needs, and to encourage the development of lifelong learning skills.

History
In the 1930s, S.J., E.J., and S.M. Deal (three sisters from Clarence E. Macartney's congregation) donated the funds for the construction of a college library in honor of their pastor. They employed architect and designer, William G. Eckles, who also designed Geneva's Johnston Gymnasium and McKee Hall, to design the library. More on the architecture and history of the constructing of the library can be found in the book, Pro Christo et Patria: A History of Geneva College, by David M. Carson.
Some of the most notable features of the library are the beautiful and ornate stained glass windows, which were created by Harry Lee Willet, a friend of Macartney and a prominent glass maker who owned one of the largest glass making companies in the United States. One of the windows depicts  John Bunyan's The Pilgrim's Progress, and the other,  John Milton's Paradise Lost. The history of the Paradise Lost window and the story that is told by it is given in the book Paradise Lost Windows: A Story in Lead and Light by Shirley J. Kilpatrick and M. Howard Mattsson-Bozé, two Geneva professors.

The library has also hosted community and regional conferences for several non-profit and for-profit organizations.

Willet Windows

One notable feature of the Library is its stained glass windows. Henry Lee Willet of Willet Stained Glass Studios, was commissioned by the Deal sisters to design and produce both of the eighteen-paneled windows in each reading room of the McCartney Library. Willet, who was a close friend of Clarence E. Macartney, was thrilled to take the project. Willet was one of the foremost stained glass makers of his time. Among his other commissions are windows at the Chapel at the United Nations, the Washington National Cathedral and the Chapel of the U.S. Military Academy at West Point. Willet Studios still exists, having merged in 2005 with the Hauser Art Glass Company to become the Willet Hauser Architectural Glass. It is the largest stained glass company in North America, and has creations in over 14 countries. The Library's Reading Rooms house the two windows, each standing fifteen feet tall. One of the windows provides an artistic depiction of John Bunyan's The Pilgrim's Progress, and the other is a depiction of John Milton's Paradise Lost.

Deal Carillon

Another feature of the library building is the Deal Carillon located in the building's bell tower. The Deal Carillon is an array of 14 bells, ranging in weight from 350 to 3,000 pounds. The bells were cast by the McShane Bell Foundry, one of the oldest foundries in the United States. They are also inscribed with psalms and excerpts from Alfred, Lord Tennyson's In Memoriam. The Deal Carillon has the special McShane Chime Ringer system, which enables the Carillon to be played as a musical instrument by using a special keyboard.

McCartney Library Collections
McCartney Library contains a variety of special collections, many of which have been donated to the library.

Main Collection
The main collection is housed on all four levels of the Library.  The largest of the Library's collections, it consists of books on numerous subjects that users may check out for a loan period of 21 days.

Reference Collection
The Reference collection, which is located primarily in the Buhl Reference Center, contains dictionaries, encyclopedias, and other resources to provide basic information on a variety of subject areas.  The Buhl Reference Center also houses several computers designated for screening the Library's online databases and CD-ROM collection.

Reserve Collection
This collection consists of items that instructors place on “reserve” to assure that the students in a particular course will have access to them.  Most reserve materials are shelved at Circulation Services, although newspapers and media are kept in the Media Center.  Reserve materials are either “library use only” (two-hour loan) or may circulate for one, two, or seven days per the professor's request.

Periodicals Collection
The periodicals collection on the Library's ground floor consists of both current and back issues of the magazines, journals, and newspapers to which the Library subscribes.  Printed indexes, which provide citations by topic to specific periodical articles, are also part of this collection.

Geneva Author Collection
The Geneva Author collection is composed of works written by College faculty, staff, alumni, and students.  The collection is showcased in the “Geneva Author Shelf,” founded by the Helen Patterson Hill Library Endowment. There are over 2,000 items in the collection.

Microform Collection
The microform collection, located in the Periodicals area on the ground floor, contains microfiche, microfilm, microcards, and ultramicrofiche.  Among the materials that the Library owns in these media are back issues of journals and newspapers, the Early American Imprints collection, the Library of American Civilization, and part of the ERIC education document collection.

Audio-Visual Collection
The Media Center contains the Library's audio-visual collection.  The collection features recordings, audiocassettes, videocassettes, DVDs, slides, computer software, CD-ROM multimedia products, and audio-visual kits.

Covenanter Collection
The Covenanter Collection, located on stack level three, contains books, pamphlets, and periodicals relating the Covenanter tradition.  Included in the collection are works about Covenanter theology and history, the Reformed Presbyterian Church of North America, and some of the denomination's individual congregations.  These materials can be accessed with the help of a librarian.

Macartney Collection
Clarence Macartney bequeathed his substantial library to the McCartney Library. The theological portion of the Macartney Collection is housed in the Library's tower room.  The remainder of the collection is housed in the compact shelving located on the Library's ground floor.  The Collection is composed primarily of the personal library and papers of Clarence Edward Noble Macartney, a prominent American preacher and church leader during the first half of the twentieth century.  The books in the collection reflect Dr. Macartney's interests in preaching, public speaking, religion, and U.S. Civil War history.  These materials can be accessed with the help of a librarian.

Juvenile Materials
The Children's Collection is located in the West Reading Room. The collection contains children's fiction and nonfiction books, including John Newbery Medal and Caldecott Medal winning titles.

References

External links

The Geneva College McCartney Library website
The Geneva College website
Willet Hauser Architectural Glass website
McShane Bell Foundry website

University and college academic libraries in the United States
Geneva College
Libraries in Pennsylvania
Towers in Pennsylvania